Lieutenant General Mykola Ivanovych Balan is a Ukrainian military official. He was commander of the National Guard of Ukraine.

Biography
Balan is a native of western Ukraine who in 1992 graduated the Saratov Higher Military Command School of the Red Banner of Feliks Dzerzhinsky of the Ministry of Internal Affairs of the Soviet Union. In 2003 he also graduated the Khmelnytskyi National Academy of the Border Troops of Ukraine. Balan graduated with honors from the National Academy for Public Administration under the President of Ukraine.

In 2010 was appointed as a chief officer of the Crimean territorial command of the Internal Troops of Ukraine.

Since 2014 he became among the leading commanding officers as a deputy commander of the newly revived National Guard in place of Internal Troops.

On 14 June 2019 President of Ukraine Volodymyr Zelensky appointed Mykola Balan commander of the National Guard of Ukraine.  Balan resigned as commander of the National Guard of Ukraine due to a shooting involving servicemen in Dnipro, Ukraine. He was officially dismissed by President Zelensky on 27 January 2022.

Decorations
 Order of Merit, 2nd degree (24 March 2017) – for personal courage and high professionalism discovered in defense of state sovereignty and territorial integrity of Ukraine, exemplary execution of military duty
 Order of Merit, 3rd degree (23 March 2012) – for a significant personal contribution in strengthening the rule of law and order, the fight against crime, exemplary performance of official duty, high professionalism and on the occasion of the Day of Internal Troops of the Ministry of Internal Affairs of Ukraine

References

1968 births
Living people
People from Ivano-Frankivsk Oblast
National Academy of State Administration alumni
Lieutenant generals of Ukraine
People of the National Guard of Ukraine
Recipients of the Order of Merit (Ukraine), 3rd class
Recipients of the Order of Merit (Ukraine), 2nd class